Melanoma-associated antigen H1 is a protein that in humans is encoded by the MAGEH1 gene.

This gene is thought to be involved in apoptosis. Multiple polyadenylation sites have been found for this gene.

Interactions
MAGEH1 has been shown to interact with Low affinity nerve growth factor receptor.

References

Further reading